Bulba is a dance based on Belarusian folk traditions.

Bulba means "potato" in Belarusian and Ukrainian.

Bulba may also refer to:
 Taras Bulba (disambiguation), a surname of several persons
 Taurus Bulba, a character in Darkwing Duck
 Bulba River, Romania
 Roman Seleznev, known by the hacker name Bulba
 Bulba Ventures, Belarusian venture capital company